Rajiv Gandhi International Cricket Stadium, also colloquially known as Dehradun Cricket stadium is a cricket stadium in the Dehradun, Uttarakhand in India. It is the home ground of Uttarakhand cricket team.

It is the first international standard stadium in the Uttarakhand state and was constructed in amount of 237 cr.  In 2018 this arena hosted its first ever ICC cricket match. Rajiv Gandhi International Stadium is India's 21st venue to host T20 internationals, and the 51st Indian international cricket venue. It is the home ground of Uttarakhand cricket team.

It is named after former prime minister of India Rajiv Gandhi.

History 

With the formation of the state in the year 2000, the state suffered a blow to its sport facilities as Uttar Pradesh had the entire infrastructure for sports and Uttarakhand had hosted very few Ranji Trophy matches. Due to the lack of infrastructure, players started moving to different states.

Due to lack of infrastructure facilities, state was not given affiliation by the Board of Control for Cricket in India to make its team to complete in Ranji Trophy and other domestic tournaments. This was a major drawback for the young cricketers in Uttarakhand who started seeking cricketing opportunities from other states.

In November 2012, the Chief Minister of Uttarakhand, Vijay Bahuguna, laid the foundation of the stadium. On 16 December 2016, Chief Minister Harish Rawat inaugurated the stadium along with Rajeev Shukla, Chairperson of the Indian Premier League. The total cost of stadium was ₹237.20 crore.  

The first ever match was played between Uttar Pradesh and Uttarakhand cricket team. International players such as Piyush Chawla and Suresh Raina etc was in the attendance.

In 2016, The Great Khali organised a professional wrestling event inside this stadium, which also featured foreign professional wrestlers. 

The stadium was selected as the second home ground for the Afghanistan cricket team in India. In 2018 this arena hosted its first ever international match, when Afghanistan played against Bangladesh in T20I here. 

The stadium suffered from lack of maintenance from the Uttarakhand government, due to deprivation of big matches and high cost to run it. The state government decided to out source private company to maintain it and rolled out tender.

The stadium hosted its inaugural ODI and Test match during series of Ireland against Afghanistan in India.

Architecture and facilities 
The stadium is located in the Raipur area of Dehradun and has a seating capacity of 25,000 people, along with floodlights facility for conducting day-night matches. The seats inside the stadium have been arranged in a manner that it gives a look of Aipan art, a traditional Kumaoni art. It is the first international standards cricket stadium in Uttarakhand state. The arena is built according to international standards, it has modern facilities such as corporate boxes, swimming pool, billiards room, gymnasium and club house. It is built on 23 acres land.

Franchise cricket 

 The matches of Road Safety World Series league held in this stadium in September 2022. Former cricketers such as Sachin Tendulkar, Brian Lara, Suresh Raina etc. played here.

List of centuries

Key
 * denotes that the batsman was not out.
 Inns. denotes the number of the innings in the match.
 Balls denotes the number of balls faced in an innings.
 NR denotes that the number of balls was not recorded.
 Parentheses next to the player's score denotes his century number at Edgbaston.
 The column title Date refers to the date the match started.
 The column title Result refers to the player's team result

ODIs

T20Is

List of five-wicket hauls

Key

Tests

T20Is

See also 
• Indira Gandhi International Sports Stadium, an anathor cricket stadium situated in Uttarakhand's Haldwani.

References

External links
Rajiv Gandhi International Cricket Stadium at ESPNcricinfo
Rajiv Gandhi International Cricket Stadium at cricbuzz
Stadium design

Sports venues in Uttarakhand
Buildings and structures in Dehradun
Sport in Dehradun
Cricket grounds in Uttarakhand
Sports venues completed in 2016
2016 establishments in Uttarakhand
Test cricket grounds in India 
 Uttarakhand
 Dehradun